The 1952 Ukrainian Cup was a football knockout competition conducting by the Football Federation of the Ukrainian SSR and was known as the Ukrainian Cup.

Teams

Non-participating teams 
The Ukrainian teams of masters did not take part in the competition.
 1952 Soviet Class A (2): FC Dynamo Kyiv, FC Shakhtar Stalino
 1952 Soviet Class B (2): FC Lokomotyv Kharkiv, DO Kyiv

Competition schedule

First elimination round

Second elimination round

Quarterfinals

Semifinals

Final 
The final was held in Zaporizhia.

Top goalscorers

See also 
 Soviet Cup
 Ukrainian Cup

Notes

References

External links 
 Information source 

1952
Cup
1952 domestic association football cups